The 2016 United States House of Representatives elections in Nevada were held on November 8, 2016, to elect the four U.S. representatives from the state of Nevada, one from each of the state's four congressional districts. The elections coincided with the 2016 U.S. presidential election, as well as other elections to the House of Representatives, elections to the United States Senate and various state and local elections. The primaries took place on June 14.

District 1

Nevada's 1st congressional district occupies the southeastern half of Nevada's largest city, Las Vegas, as well as parts of North Las Vegas and parts of unincorporated Clark County. The incumbent was Democrat Dina Titus, who has represented the 1st district since she won election in 2012. With incumbent Democratic Senator Harry Reid not running for reelection, Titus was considering running for Senate. However, she decided to run for re-election.

Mary Perry, an attorney who ran for District Court Judge in 2014, was selected as the Republican nominee.

Democratic primary

Results

Republican primary

Results

General election

District 2

Nevada's 2nd congressional district includes the northern third of the state.  It includes most of Douglas and Lyon counties, all of Churchill,  Elko, Eureka, Humboldt, Pershing and Washoe counties, as well as the state capital, Carson City. The largest city in the district is Reno, the state's second largest city. Although the district appears rural, its politics are dominated by Reno and Carson City, which combined cast over 85 percent of the district's vote. The incumbent is Republican Mark Amodei, who has represented the 2nd district since September 2011 following a special election upon the appointment of Dean Heller to the Senate.

Amodei was mentioned as a potential candidate for the U.S. Senate, but denied having any interest.  In May 2015 Amodei reiterated his commitment to running for re-election.

Democratic primary

Results

General election

District 3

The 3rd congressional district occupies the area south of Las Vegas, including Henderson, and most of unincorporated Clark County. The district was initially created after the 2000 census. The incumbent is Republican Joe Heck, who has represented the 3rd district since January 2011. Heck did not seek re-election to the U.S. House, instead running for the U.S. Senate seat vacated by Harry Reid.

Republican primary

Candidates
Declared
 Michele Fiore, State Assemblywoman and candidate for NV-01 in 2010
 Andy Matthews, President of the Nevada Policy Research Institute
 Michael Roberson, Minority Leader of the Nevada Senate
 Danny Tarkanian, businessman, nominee for Secretary of State in 2006, candidate for U.S Senate in 2010 and nominee for NV-04 in 2012
 Annette Teijeiro, physician and nominee for NV-01 in 2014

Declined
 Bob Beers, Las Vegas City Councilman, former State Senator and candidate for Governor in 2006
 Joe Heck, incumbent U.S. Representative (running for U.S. Senate)

Endorsements

Results

Democratic primary

Candidates
Declared
 Barry Michaels, businessman, ex-felon, Democratic candidate in 2006, 2008, and 2012 and Independent candidate in 2010
Jacky Rosen, synagogue president
 Jesse Sbaih, attorney
 Steven Mitchell Schiffman, attorney
 Alex Channing Singer
 Neil M. Waite

Declined
 Aaron D. Ford, Minority Leader of the Nevada Senate
 Paula Francis, journalist and former KLAS-TV news anchor
 Susie Lee, President of Communities in Schools of Nevada (running for NV-04)
 Ross Miller, former Secretary of State and nominee for Attorney General in 2014
 Heather Murren, former securities analyst, Financial Crisis Inquiry Commission member, co-founder of the Nevada Cancer Institute and wife of MGM Resorts International CEO James Murren
 John Oceguera, former Speaker of the Nevada Assembly and nominee in 2012 (ran for NV-04)

Results

General election

Candidates
 Danny Tarkanian (R), businessman, nominee for Secretary of State in 2006, candidate for U.S Senate in 2010 and nominee for NV-04 in 2012
 Jacklyn Rosen (D), synagogue president

Polling

Results

District 4

The 4th Congressional District is a new district that was created as a result of the 2010 Census.  Located in the central portion of the state, it includes most of northern Clark County, parts of Douglas and Lyon counties, and all of Esmeralda, Lincoln, Mineral, Nye and White Pine counties. More than four-fifths of the district's population lives in Clark County.

In 2014, Republican Cresent Hardy defeated the Democratic incumbent Representative, Steven Horsford. After the election, Horsford indicated that he might run against Hardy in 2016, but later declined.

Potential Democratic candidates who were named in the local media included State Senator Kelvin Atkinson; Las Vegas City Councilman Ricki Barlow; former State Assemblywoman and 2014 nominee for Lieutenant Governor Lucy Flores; State Senator Ruben Kihuen; North Las Vegas Mayor and former state legislator John Jay Lee; Susie Lee, the president of Communities in Schools of Nevada; and, State Senator Pat Spearman. Former Representative Shelley Berkley, who represented the 1st congressional district from 1999 to 2013 and unsuccessfully ran for the Senate in 2012, has declined a run for the seat.

Kihuen became the first Democrat to announce his campaign for the seat in March 2015. Flores entered the race in April.

Republican primary

Results

Democratic primary

Candidates
Declared
 Lucy Flores, former State Assemblywoman and nominee for Lieutenant Governor in 2014
 Ruben Kihuen, State Senator and candidate for NV-01 in 2012
 Susie Lee, President of Communities in Schools of Nevada
 Dan Rolle 
Withdrawn
 John Oceguera, former Speaker of the Nevada Assembly and nominee for NV-03 in 2012

Declined
 Shelley Berkley, former U.S. Representative and nominee for U.S. Senate in 2012
 Steven Horsford, former U.S. Representative

Endorsements

Results

General election

Candidates
 Cresent Hardy (R), incumbent U.S. Representative
 Ruben Kihuen (D), State Senator and candidate for NV-01 in 2012

Polling

Results

References

External links
 U.S. House elections in Nevada, 2016 at Ballotpedia
 Campaign contributions at OpenSecrets

Nevada
2016
United States House